Judy Rankin ( Torluemke; born February 18, 1945) is an American professional golfer and golf broadcaster. A member of the World Golf Hall of Fame, she joined the LPGA Tour in 1962 at age 17 and won 26 tour events.

Since 2010, Rankin has served as the lead analyst for LPGA Tour telecasts on the Golf Channel. She previously served as an expert analyst for golf coverage on ESPN/ABC.

Amateur career
Born and raised in St. Louis, Missouri, Rankin won the Missouri Amateur at age 14 in 1959. The next year she was the low amateur at the U.S. Women's Open, and was on the cover of Sports Illustrated in 1961 at age 16. She turned pro the following year.

Professional career
Rankin's first LPGA Tour win came in 1968 and she won 26 events, topping the money list in 1976 and 1977. She finished in the top ten on the money list eleven times between 1965 and 1979, and was the first to win over $100,000 in a season on the LPGA Tour (over $150,000 in 1976).

Although Rankin did not win a major championship, she was a four-time runner-up. Her best finishes were a second at the 1976 LPGA Championship and tied seconds at the 1972 Titleholders Championship, 1972 U.S. Women's Open, and 1977 LPGA Championship. Rankin won the Colgate Dinah Shore Winner's Circle (currently the ANA Inspiration) in 1976 and the Peter Jackson Classic (later renamed the du Maurier Classic) in 1977; both events were later elevated to major status, but are not counted as majors in the years in which Rankin won. Her 26th and final win on tour was in August 1979 at Jericho, New York.

Rankin was LPGA Player of the Year twice (1976, 1977) and won the Vare Trophy for the lowest scoring average three times. She retired from full-time competition at age 38 in 1983 due to chronic back problems, and later captained the victorious Solheim Cup teams in 1996 and 1998. Rankin became the first player voted into the LPGA Tour Hall of Fame in 2000 under the veterans category, and she was also inducted into the World Golf Hall of Fame in 2000.

In 2002, she was voted the Bob Jones Award, the highest honor given by the United States Golf Association in recognition of distinguished sportsmanship in golf.

She was awarded a star on the St. Louis Walk of Fame in April 2013.

Broadcasting career
From 1984 until 2018, Rankin worked as a golf commentator for ESPN and ABC. In 2010, she became the lead LPGA analyst for the Golf Channel.

She has also been a professional advisor for the magazines Golf Digest and Golf For Women.

Personal life
Rankin was known as Judy Torluemke (pronounced Tor-lum-kee), until her marriage to Walter "Yippy" Rankin in 1967. They lived in Midland, Texas, and have a son, Walter Jr., known as "Tuey," born in 1968. After a battle with throat cancer, Yippy died at age 71 on February 24, 2012. Tuey's wife is the sister-in-law of PGA Tour golfer Geoff Ogilvy.

Rankin was diagnosed with breast cancer in May 2006. She completed treatment by August 2006 and returned to her on-air work on ABC Sports in time to cover the 2006 Women's British Open.

Professional wins

LPGA wins (26)

Note: Rankin won the Colgate-Dinah Shore Winner's Circle (now the ANA Inspiration)and the Peter Jackson Classic (later the du Maurier Classic) before they became major championships.

LPGA Tour playoff record (4–12)

Other wins (2)
1974 (1) Colgate European Open
1977 (1) LPGA National Team Championship (with JoAnne Carner)

See also
List of golfers with most LPGA Tour wins

References

External links

American female golfers
LPGA Tour golfers
World Golf Hall of Fame inductees
Golf writers and broadcasters
Golfers from St. Louis
Golfers from Texas
Women sports announcers
People from Midland, Texas
1945 births
Living people
21st-century American women